is a Japanese politician serving in the House of Representatives in the Diet (national legislature) as a member of the New Komeito Party. A native of Kitakyushu, Fukuoka and graduate of Soka University she was elected for the first time in 2003.

References

External links

 Official website in Japanese.

1952 births
Living people
People from Kitakyushu
Female members of the House of Representatives (Japan)
Members of the House of Representatives (Japan)
New Komeito politicians
21st-century Japanese women politicians
21st-century Japanese politicians